The province of Lima is divided into forty-three districts of Lima which are administered by the Metropolitan Municipality of Lima The urban area of Lima is generally considered to be formed by thirty of these districts. The remaining thirteen districts consist of mostly rural and sparsely populated desert and mountainous areas. Of these peripheral districts, many of the coastal ones serve as beach resorts and their population, which is considerably smaller than that of the urban districts, increases during the summer months.

Districts of Lima
Area and population information on the following list has been retrieved from official data by the Peruvian National Institute of Statistics and Informatics (INEI). Demographic data is based on the 2005 Census carried out from 18 July through 20 August 2005. Population density is given to one decimal place in persons per square kilometer. UBIGEO numbers are codes used by INEI to identify national administrative subdivisions. Foundation dates have been retrieved from a compilation by the Peruvian Congress published in 2000.

See also
 Administrative divisions of Peru

References

Districts
Lima Districts